Justice McKinney may refer to:

Colin P. McKinney (1873–1944), associate justice of the Tennessee Supreme Court
John T. McKinney (1785–1837), associate justice of the Supreme Court of Indiana
Robert J. McKinney, associate justice of the Tennessee Supreme Court